The Gobi bear (Ursus arctos gobiensis), known in Mongolian as the Mazaalai, is a subspecies of the brown bear (Ursus arctos) that is found in the Gobi Desert of Mongolia. It is listed as critically endangered by the Mongolian Redbook of Endangered Species and by IUCN standards. Recent surveys documented just 51 bears in 2022, a slight increase from an estimate of 40 bears in 2017. Gobi bears are separated by enough distance from other brown bear populations to achieve reproductive isolation. In 1959, hunting of the animal was prohibited in order to preserve the dying subspecies.

Threats 
The Gobi bear population is restricted to 23,600 km2 in areas that are in close proximity to water sources (Reynolds et al. 2010, Luvsamjamba et al. 2016), and the population is isolated from other populations by inhospitable low elevation deserts, pastoral activities, and human settlements.

Conservation 
A conservation measure for the Gobi Bear has been in place since 1985, which is a supplemental feeding program, pellets containing wheat (Triticum aestivum), corn (Zea mays), carrots (Daucus carota sativus), and turnips (Brassica rapa) are provided in spring and autumn at feeders located near selected waterholes throughout the GGSPA A.

Behavior and Ecology 
Gobi bears mainly eat roots, berries, and other plants, sometimes rodents; there is no evidence that they prey on large mammals. The diet of a Gobi Bear is only about 8% animal protein. Gobi bears are the only bears that have evolved and adapted to living in such extreme hot desert climates.

Genetic diversity 
Gobi bears have a very low genetic diversity, among the lowest ever observed in any subspecies of brown bear. The brown bear in the Gobi desert of southwestern Mongolia (referred to as the Gobi bear) is one of the smallest and most isolated brown bear populations in the world.Levels of genetic diversity similar to the Gobi bears have been reported only in a small population of brown bears in the Pyrenees Mountains on the border of Spain and France. The Gobi bear is the only brown bear population adapted to living in an extreme desert environment, and its distribution has decreased by 60% since the 1970s.The low genetic diversity is the result of Gobi bears having a highly skewed sex ratio of males to females. There are about 21 males to 8 females. This the main cause of such low reproduction and population. In addition, research has shown there is a low number of alleles per locus in their DNA. This means that Gobi bear DNA is fragile and therefore affects their reproduction.

Research 
Historically, based on morphology, the Gobi brown bear has, sometimes, been classified as being in same subspecies as the Tibetan blue bear. However, recent phylogenetic analysis has shown that although the Gobi bear and Himalayan brown bear have a shared ancestry, both bear populations are genetically isolated.

As of 2022, there are a reported 51 bears in the wild. The Gobi bears used to populate about 23,619 kilometers of land in Southwestern Mongolia. This number has decreased by nearly sixty percent due to the scarcity of food and water. They eat berries, vegetation, insects and occasionally rodents.

See also 
 Bear

References

Sources 
 
 
 
Tumendemberel, Odbayar (2020). "Evolutionary history, demographics, and conservation of brown bears (Ursus arctos): filling the knowledge gap in Central Asia". Ph.D. dissertation. University of South-Eastern Norway.

Further reading 
  Preview.

Mammals described in 1992
Eurasian brown bears
Carnivorans of Asia
Critically endangered fauna of Asia
Endemic fauna of Mongolia
Gobi Desert
Mammals of Mongolia